Jelena Karleuša (born 17 August 1978) is a Serbian singer and media personality. Born and raised in Belgrade, she rose to prominence upon the release of her debut album Ogledalce in 1995, which was succeeded by five more records released in quick succession to moderate success.

In 2002, Karleuša achieved further acclaim by collaborating with Greek label Heaven Music on the album Samo za tvoje oči. Following the success of her subsequent releases, Magija (2005) and JK Revolution (2008), in May 2010, she held a concert in the Belgrade Arena, titled All About Diva Show, in front of 15,000 fans. Her tenth electropop-oriented album Diva was released in 2012. It was promoted with Viva La Diva Show at the Belgrade's Ušće Park in June 2013, to reported 40,000 people. Karleuša also served as a judge and mentor on the popular televised singing competition Zvezde Granda between 2015 and 2021.

Karleuša was described as the "Madonna of the Balkans" and "Lady Gaga of Serbia" by Focus and W magazine, respectively, having received significant media coverage due to her provocative and often controversial public persona. Public surveys have cited her as one of the biggest role models of Serbian youth. Karleuša also amassed significant social media following, being the second most-followed person from Serbia on Instagram with over 2.4 million followers.

Early life
Jelena Karleuša was born on 17 August 1978 in Belgrade, SR Serbia, SFR Yugoslavia. She is the only child to Slovenian-born journalist and radio host, Divna (1958-2019), and Belgrade-born police Capitan, Dragan Karleuša (1947). She stated that her maternal great-grandmother was an Austrian countess who has a street in Graz named after her, which was, however, denied by the Austrian media and the City of Graz. 

Karleuša grew-up in the Fontana neighborhood of New Belgrade, where she lived with her mother after her parents had divorced. She attended Zemun Gymnasium, but eventually graduated from the New Belgrade's High School of Tourism. According to Karleuša, she also attended music school and played the flute as a child. She cited Lepa Brena as one of her main musical influences growing up.

Career

1990s
At sixteen years of age, Karleuša made her recording debut with a financial help from singer Dragana Mirković. Her first album, Ogledalce (Little Mirror), was released on 24 April 1995 by Diskos in 100,000 copies. She made her first performance the same year at the annual Poselo 202 manifestation, which was organized by her mother Divna Karleuša. Her sophomore album, Ženite se momci (Guys, Get Married), was released the following year under PGP-RTS.

Her next two albums - Veštice, vile (Witches, Fairies, 1997) and Jelena (1998), were released through ZaM. These records spawned popular songs like "Ko ovu dramu režira" (Who Directs this Drama), "Jelena" and "Žene vole dijamante" (Women Love Diamonds), written by Marina Tucaković, who was behind some of Jelena's greatest hits. The latter song covered "Şımarık" by the Turkish singer Tarkan. In 1999, she released her only album for Grand Production, under the title Gili, gili (Tickle, Tickle), which was sold in 250,000 copies.

2000s
In January 2001, Karleuša released her sixth album Za svoje godine (For My Own Years) under Best Records. It was promoted with a music video for the song "Ludača" (Madwoman).

In December 2002, her studio album Samo za tvoje oči (For Your Eyes Only) was released under BK Sound in Serbia and Montenegro. The album was created in collaboration with Greek label Heaven Music. The R&B-influenced songs were written by Phoebus and Marina Tucaković, while the back vocals were sang by Toše Proeski. She was also supposed to release an extended play in English with Heaven Music for international market, which was praised by Serbian magazine NIN, describing her as the "best Serbian export product". Eventually, Karleuša terminated the four-year contract with the Greek label. In April the following year, Karleuša performed a medley from Samo za tvoje oči at the 2003 Beovizija music festival, where she received the award for the "Foreign break-through".

In February 2004, Karleuša competed at the 2004 Beovizija, organized and broadcast by Radio Television of Serbia, with the song "Moli me" (Beg Me) in order to represent Serbia and Montenegro at the Eurovision Song Contest. Based on the jury's votes, she was placed 11th. Despite receiving bad critiques for her vocals, Karleuša was complimented for her stage performance. Following her appearance at Beovizija, Karleuša got banned from RTS by its director, Aleksandar Tijanić. The reason for this decision, according to her, was due to the fact that her appearance and music were deemed "inappropriate" by Tijanić. In September 2016, it was reported that Karleuša would appear on RTS for the first time in over a decade as a guest on a talk show about fashion, called Lice i potpetice, which aired in March 2017. Her subsequent album Magija (Magic) was released in February 2005 under City Records. It was promoted with two music videos for the songs "Slatka mala" (Cutie) and "Upravo ostavljena" (Just Broken Up With), which generated controversy with conservative and religious groups for respectively featuring scenes with drag queens and Karleuša crucified.

In February 2008, Karleuša released JK Revolution, which was sold in 280,000 copies. However, despite its commercial success, the album's promotion was also followed with several controversies. Karleuša faced public scrutiny for the infamous studio session of the lead single "Tihi ubica" (Silent Killer), which had been leaked to the public and provoked discussion about her vocal abilities. Subsequently, the music video for the song, which was filmed in the historical Karlovci Gymnasium, started a petition from its professors, students and their parents to ban the video in order to protect their school's "reputation". Serbian magazine Vreme, however, commented on the situation as an example of "false morality", stating that the music video did not contain anything worthy of censorship.

In March 2009, she entered the third season of Big Brother VIP as a guest for a day. In July, Karleuša released a compilation album, titled The Diamond Collection, featuring thirty five songs. She also dropped her single "Insomnia" in December, which covered a Bollywood song from the movie Rab Ne Bana Di Jodi. The electro-infused single was downloaded over a million times for free from Karleuša's official website. Furthermore, the song's visual became one of the first Serbian music videos to go viral on YouTube.

2010s
On 10 May 2010, Karleuša held her first large concert at the Belgrade Arena under the name All About Diva Show. The live show, which was conceptually divided into three sections, attracted around 15,000 people. In November, she released the live album and the DVD from the concert, which was two years later, upon the release of her next album, certified platinum by the label. During the same year, Karleuša also landed a column in the daily newspaper Kurir, which attracted significant attention for her support for the LGBT community in Serbia after the first Belgrade Pride, but also for her outspoken comments on public figures such as Svetlana Ceca Ražnatović and Dragan Marković Palma.

Her tenth album Diva was released on 11 June 2012, after being postponed several times. It was preceded by three singles: "Insomnia" (2009), "Muškarac koji mrzi žene" (Man Who Hates Women) and "Nova religija" (New Religion, 2011). The album saw commercial success, becoming one of the fastest-selling albums by a Serbian artist. Diva also marked a significant departure from her previous pop-folk releases, as it comprises dance-pop and electropop tracks with hip-hop and R&B influences. The album was promoted with two music videos: "Krimi rad" (Criminal Work) featuring Techa and "So" (Salt) featuring Nesh, released in July and September 2012, respectively.

Karleuša announced her second Belgrade concert for 15 June 2013 in Ušće park. The concert, titled Viva La Diva Show, began after over an hour of delay due to technical issues regarding video and audio production, which continued throughout the show. Nevertheless, she managed to perform all of the songs. According to her management, Viva La Diva Show attracted 40,000 people. Afterwards, Karleuša faced heavy criticism from the media because of which she eventually decided to take a break from public. Additionally, she became blacklisted on Serbian television network Pink after an argument with its owner, Željko Mitrović. In this case Karleuša also lost her recording contract with City Records, which is also owned by Mitrović. She returned to TV Pink in late 2018 by making several television appearances, but was subsequently banned once again after another altercation with Mitrović. This time, the argument initiated after reporters working for Pink had continuously filmed Karleuša at her mother's grave to her dismay.

In 2015, Karleuša ended her hiatus by becoming a judge, and later a mentor, on the reality competition Zvezde Granda. During 2015, she saw international attention after she had accused Kim Kardashian, and then Beyoncé, of copying her fashion style and thus was featured on The Wendy Williams Show, among many other international media outlets. The following year, Jelena's style was praised by Kardashian in her Woman Crush Wednesday column, claiming that she heard of Karleuša only after the media allegations. 

At the beginning of 2016, Karleuša revealed that the 2015 Academy Award-winning documentary about Amy Winehouse falsely used unlicensed scenes from her 2013 concert as ones of Winehouse's last Belgrade show. Karleuša initially planned to settle a lawsuit against the creators for copyright infringement, but eventually gave up due to respect of the late singer. In March 2016, she made a guest performance at Vodafone Park in Istanbul after her husband's team, Besiktas J.K. had won the national championship. The following June, Karleuša presented her first releases since 2013: "Bankina" (Hard Shoulder) and "Ostavljam te" (I'm Leaving You), two duets featuring Aca Lukas and Azis, respectively. The songs were performed on the live finale of Zvezde Granda.

In late January 2019, Karleuša performed "LaJK" (Like) featuring Serbian rapper Gazda Paja at the 2019 Music Awards Ceremony.

2020s
During the COVID-19 pandemic in 2020, she announced her online concert via Serbian music service YouBox, which took place on May 24. The live stream performance attracted over 200,000 viewers. On stage Karleuša was also joined by the girl-group Hurricane, who were supposed to represent Serbia on the Eurovision Song Contest that year, and singer Milica Pavlović. In December 2020, Karleuša revealed that she was also supposed to represent Slovenia at the Eurovision Song contest with the song "La Bomba", but eventually gave up on it. The song was later re-recorded in English and Spanish featuring Brazilian drag queen and singer Pabllo Vittar, which was announced at the beginning of 2020.

In September 2021, she announced her decision to quit Zvezde Granda after serving as a judge for five consecutive seasons. For the New Year's Eve, Karleuša performed alongside Marija Šerifović and Sara Jo in front of the National Assembly of Serbia to the estimated crowd of up to 50,000 people. In October 2022, she made her runway debut at the Steve Madden fashion show in Belgrade, organized by Fashion Company.

Personal life
On 23 September 2004, Karleuša married the nephew of Serbian businessman Bogoljub Karić, Bojan Karić. Their marriage was ended in March the following year.

In June 2006, Karleuša started dating Serbian footballer Duško Tošić. The couple was eventually married two years later on 28 June 2008. They have two daughters: Atina ( 2008) and Nika ( 2009), both born on 7 September by Caesarean section. In January 2022, Tošić received a 30 day restriction order under suspicion of domestic abuse following her report on the Christmas Day according to Julian calendar. According to the media, this was the second time Karleuša reported her husband for physical assault, with first being in March 2020. In both cases she decided not to press charges against him. On 5 July 2022, Karleuša confirmed via her Instagram profile that Tošić and her would be separating after 14 years of marriage. She further stated that they mutually agreed that she receives the custody over their daughters.

In December 2020, Karleuša said that she also holds Slovenian passport because her mother was born in Ljubljana.

Karleuša identifies as an atheist. She has also been vegetarian since 2016, and stated that she would like to go fully vegan.

Philanthropy
Recognized for supporting LGBT rights in Serbia, Karleuša was awarded with the title of a gay icon in 2010 by the Gay Lesbian Info Centre. Morover, she served as the "pride godmother" during the 2017 Belgrade Pride.

Karleuša has been noted for supporting various other causes during her career. Following the 2014 Southeast Europe floods, she supplied Serbian shelters with basic necessities for three consecutive days. Also that year, Karleuša and her husband were amongst the few regional celebrities who financially contributed to ALS research after participating in the ice bucket challenge. In 2015, she performed at Donna Ares' charity concert for victims of cancer in Zetra Olympic Hall, Sarajevo. In December 2018, Karleuša donated 100,000 RSD to VK Partizan for pool-heating during winter seasons. Also vocal on the topic of animal rights, she collaborated with PETA on their anti-fur campaign in July 2018.

Politics
In 1999, Karleuša, among many other singers, performed at the Republic Square in Belgrade as a part of a series of concerts organized by the head of state during the NATO bombing of Yugoslavia.

She has expressed her sympathies for Zoran Đinđić. Her father, Dragan Karleuša, who served as the deputy head of the Criminal Police Directorate of Serbia, took part in the Operation Sabre, which was organized as a result of the assassination of Đinđić in 2003. In response to Vojislav Šešelj talking approvingly about the assassination of Đinđić in 2016, Karleuša wrote on Twitter that "it's a good thing that Šešelj is dying from cancer".

Karleuša also showed her support for Čedomir Jovanović. In October 2010, she appeared as a guest on the public panel against violence organized at the Institution of Culture "Vuk Stefanović Karadžić" by Jovanović and the Liberal Democratic Party.

On 2 January 2016, Kareluša was as guest on a political talk show aired on Happy TV alongside president Aleksandar Vučić, where she served as an opposing figure to his politics. On 6 April 2017, Karleuša addressed Vučić in an open letter on Facebook criticizing him for his politics, media censorship and for his answer to the 2017 Serbian protests. Before the 2022 Serbian general election, however, Karleuša publicly stated that she would vote for Vučić, explaining that according to her there was no other current "serious" political option in Serbia besides him.

Karleuša has also displayed her open disapproval for Bosnian Serb politician Milorad Dodik. She publically acknowledged the 1995 Srebrenica massacre perpetrated by units of the Army of Republika Srpska under the command of Ratko Mladić.

Legal issues
In 2010, Serbian singer Svetlana "Ceca" Ražnatović began a legal action against Karleuša for defamation after she had addressed Ražnatović in an open letter via Facebook, accusing her of maintaining close ties with the Zemun clan through connections from her late husband, Željko Ražnatović, and of being involved in the 1999 assassination of Karleuša's then-boyfriend, Zoran Davidović, who was also connected with crime. Furthermore, she addressed the rumors of Ceca purposely creating bad publicity for Karleuša through her acquaintances in the media and show business. In February 2017, Svetlana Ražnatović claimed victory over Karleuša, who was fined with €650 and ordered to cover Ceca's €900 court expenses.

On 10 April 2018, Karleuša was interrogated under suspicion of spreading panic amidst national measles epidemic, after she had publicly advocated for the freedom of choice when it comes to MMR vaccination. She explained that she based her views on personal experience with one of her daughters, who according to her, had a bad reaction following the vaccination. While publicly receiving her COVID-19 vaccine in May 2021, Karleuša accentuated that she is not "anti-vax" and encouraged Serbian people to also get vaccinated.

At the beginning of 2019, Serbian media started accusing Karleuša of having an affair with Bosnian footballer Ognjen Vranješ, which she firmly denied. The scandal subsequently erupted when nude photos of her started circulating the web and were eventually placed on the cover of every daily tabloid in Serbia. On January 14, Karleuša took to Twitter, claiming that the majority of the photos had been edited, while the rest had been stolen from her cell phone. Her Twitter account also got suspended after she had posted private nude photo's of Vranješ, which according to her, she received from a female singer who was involved with him. Between January and February 2019, Karleuša made 110 front page headlines of the daily newspapers, where she was featured in mostly negative content, which was in reference to her private life. Serbian Press Council publicly condemned tabloids for violating Serbian Codex of journalism, citing this incident as a prime example of the downfall of Serbian media scene in recent years. The State Secretary of the Ministry of Culture and Information, Aleksandar Gajović, declared on January 16 that the Ministry would submit infringement reports against Serbian tabloids Kurir, Informer, Alo! and Srpski telegraf for their sexually explicit front pages. The Commissioner for the Protection of Equality, Brankica Janković, stated that tabloids continued breaking the Codex of journalism by promoting "belittling and insulting" content as well as gender stereotypes in spite of reprimands from the Ministry. Karleuša herself stated that she had initiated over 140 charges against Vranješ and mentioned newspapers for defamation and that all the proceeds from the lawsuits would go to charity.

Discography

Studio albums
Ogledalce (1995)
Ženite se momci (1996)
Veštice, vile (1997)
Jelena (1998)
Gili, gili (1999)
Za svoje godine (2001)
Samo za tvoje oči (2002)
Magija (2005)
JK Revolution (2008)
Diva (2012)
Alpha (2023)

Awards and nominations

  Karleuša asked her fans purposely not to vote for her, because in her opinion she can't be labelled as 'folk' singer.

See also
Music of Serbia
List of singers from Serbia
List of best-selling albums from Serbia

References

External links

1978 births
Living people
21st-century Serbian women singers
Singers from Belgrade
Serbian turbo-folk singers
Serbian pop singers
Serbian television personalities
Grand Production artists
Serbian LGBT rights activists
Fashion designers from Belgrade
Serbian atheists
Association footballers' wives and girlfriends
Serbian people of Slovenian descent
Serbian people of Bosnia and Herzegovina descent
Beovizija contestants